Municipalities across the Canadian province of Ontario held elections on December 4, 1972, to elect mayors, reeves, councillors, and school trustees. Some municipalities also held votes for utility commissioners.

The most closely watched contest was in Toronto, where Red Tory candidate David Crombie was elected as mayor.

1972 elections in Canada
Municipal elections in Ontario
1972 in Ontario
December 1972 events in Canada